Lyons USD 405 is a public unified school district headquartered in Lyons, Kansas, United States.  The district includes the communities of Lyons, Mitchell, Pollard, and nearby rural areas.

Schools
The school district operates the following schools:
 Lyons High School
 Lyons Middle School
 Central Elementary School
 Park Elementary School

See also
 Kansas State Department of Education
 Kansas State High School Activities Association
 List of high schools in Kansas
 List of unified school districts in Kansas

References

External links
 

School districts in Kansas
Education in Rice County, Kansas